The 2015 Bulgarian Cup Final was the 75th final of the Bulgarian Cup, and was contested between Levski Sofia and Cherno More Varna on 30 May 2015 at Lazur Stadium in Burgas. Cherno More won the final 2–1, claiming their first Bulgarian Cup title.

The winner qualified for the second qualifying round of the 2015–16 UEFA Europa League and will also face the champions of the 2014–15 A Group in the 2015 Bulgarian Supercup.

Route to the Final

Match

Details

See also
2014–15 A Group

References

Bulgarian Cup finals
Cup Final
PFC Cherno More Varna matches
PFC Levski Sofia matches